In software engineering, a project fork happens when developers take a copy of source code from one software package and start independent development on it, creating a distinct and separate piece of software. The term often implies not merely a development branch, but also a split in the developer community; as such, it is a form of schism. Grounds for forking are varying user preferences and stagnated or discontinued development of the original software.

Free and open-source software is that which, by definition, may be forked from the original development team without prior permission, and without violating copyright law. However, licensed forks of proprietary software (e.g. Unix) also happen.

Etymology 
The word "fork" has been used to mean "to divide in branches, go separate ways" as early as the 14th century. In the software environment, the word evokes the fork system call, which causes a running process to split itself into two (almost) identical copies that (typically) diverge to perform different tasks.

In the context of software development, "fork" was used in the sense of creating a revision control "branch" by Eric Allman as early as 1980, in the context of Source Code Control System:

The term was in use on Usenet by 1983 for the process of creating a subgroup to move topics of discussion to.

"Fork" is not known to have been used in the sense of a community schism during the origins of Lucid Emacs (now XEmacs) (1991) or the Berkeley Software Distributions (BSDs) (1993–1994); Russ Nelson used the term "shattering" for this sort of fork in 1993, attributing it to John Gilmore. However, "fork" was in use in the present sense by 1995 to describe the XEmacs split, and was an understood usage in the GNU Project by 1996.

Forking of free and open-source software
Free and open-source software may be legally forked without prior approval of those currently developing, managing, or distributing the software per both The Free Software Definition and The Open Source Definition:

In free software, forks often result from a schism over different goals or personality clashes. In a fork, both parties assume nearly identical code bases, but typically only the larger group, or whoever controls the web site, will retain the full original name and the associated user community. Thus, there is a reputation penalty associated with forking. The relationship between the different teams can be cordial or very bitter. On the other hand, a friendly fork or a soft fork is a fork that does not intend to compete, but wants to eventually merge with the original.

Eric S. Raymond, in his essay Homesteading the Noosphere, stated that "The most important characteristic of a fork is that it spawns competing projects that cannot later exchange code, splitting the potential developer community". He notes in the Jargon File:

David A. Wheeler notes four possible outcomes of a fork, with examples:

 The death of the fork. This is by far the most common case. It is easy to declare a fork, but considerable effort to continue independent development and support.
 A re-merging of the fork (e.g., egcs becoming "blessed" as the new version of GNU Compiler Collection.)
 The death of the original (e.g. the X.Org Server succeeding and XFree86 dying.)
 Successful branching, typically with differentiation (e.g., OpenBSD and NetBSD.)

Distributed revision control (DVCS) tools have popularised a less emotive use of the term "fork", blurring the distinction with "branch". With a DVCS such as Mercurial or Git, the normal way to contribute to a project, is to first create a personal branch of the repository, independent of the main repository, and later seek to have your changes integrated with it. Sites such as GitHub, Bitbucket and Launchpad provide free DVCS hosting expressly supporting independent branches, such that the technical, social and financial barriers to forking a source code repository are massively reduced, and GitHub uses "fork" as its term for this method of contribution to a project.

Forks often restart version numbering from 0.1 or 1.0 even if the original software was at version 3.0, 4.0, or 5.0. An exception is when the forked software is designed to be a drop-in replacement for the original project, e.g. MariaDB for MySQL or LibreOffice for OpenOffice.org.

The BSD licenses permit forks to become proprietary software, and copyleft proponents say that commercial incentives thus make proprietisation almost inevitable. (Copyleft licenses can, however, be circumvented via dual-licensing with a proprietary grant in the form of a Contributor License Agreement.) Examples include macOS (based on the proprietary NeXTSTEP and the open source FreeBSD), Cedega and CrossOver (proprietary forks of Wine, though CrossOver tracks Wine and contributes considerably), EnterpriseDB (a fork of PostgreSQL, adding Oracle compatibility features), Supported PostgreSQL with their proprietary ESM storage system, and Netezza's proprietary highly scalable derivative of PostgreSQL. Some of these vendors contribute back changes to the community project, while some keep their changes as their own competitive advantages.

Forking proprietary software
In proprietary software, the copyright is usually held by the employing entity, not by the individual software developers. Proprietary code is thus more commonly forked when the owner needs to develop two or more versions, such as a windowed version and a command line version, or versions for differing operating systems, such as a word processor for IBM PC compatible machines and Macintosh computers. Generally, such internal forks will concentrate on having the same look, feel, data format, and behavior between platforms so that a user familiar with one can also be productive or share documents generated on the other. This is almost always an economic decision to generate a greater market share and thus pay back the associated extra development costs created by the fork.

A notable proprietary fork not of this kind is the many varieties of proprietary Unix—almost all derived from AT&T Unix under license and all called "Unix", but increasingly mutually incompatible. See Unix wars.

See also
 List of software forks
 Source port
 Downstream (software development)
 Group decision-making
 Modular programming
 Modding
 Custom software
 Personalization
 Team effectiveness
 Duplicate code
 ROM Hacking

References

External links
 Right to Fork at Meatball Wiki
 A PhD examining forking: (Nyman, 2015) "Understanding Code Forking in Open Source Software – An examination of code forking, its effect on open source software, and how it is viewed and practiced by developers"

 
Software project management